Dimitrije Najdanović (Serbian Cyrillic: Димитрије Најдановић; 7 June 1897 – 24 March 1986) was a Serbian theologian, writer, and Serbian Orthodox priest.

Biography
Dimitrije Najdanović was born in Kragujevac in Serbia, on 7 June 1897, into comfortable middle-class circumstances. He was the son of a devoutly Serbian Orthodox mother and a strict but personable schoolteacher-father.

He followed the events of the escalating conflict between Austria and Serbia, but until 1914 he was not yet ready to participate in anything other than relief work and home training. Soon after he turned seventeen—old enough for wartime military—a relative managed to arrange an appointment to an officers' training program. He saw action on the Eastern Front, the retreat over the Albanian mountains and the opening of the Salonika front, and the eventual hard-earned victory in 1918.

From the grammar school in Kragujevac, he passed to the gymnasium in Belgrade, where the study of Plato appears especially to have engrossed him. He graduated from the prestigious Saint Sava Seminary, better known as Bogoslovija in 1935, and studied philosophy and theology at the University of Belgrade from 1935 to 1938. According to his biography, Najdanović joined the Yugoslav National Movement at the behest of his mentor Veselin Čajkanović in 1935. He went to the University of Berlin to pursue his post-graduate studies in philosophy and theology. Here Nicolai Hartmann and Eduard Spranger were lecturing. Najdanović found in them the very impulse which he needed, while Hartmann and Spranger found a pupil of thoroughly congenial feeling, and one destined to carry out their views in a higher and more effective Christian form than they themselves were capable of imparting. Najdanović's doctoral thesis was entitled: Die Geschichtsphilosophie Immanuel Hermann Fichtes.
 
Between wars, he founded three magazines and journals, Svetosavlje (Holy Sava), Put (Path), and Hrisčanske misli (Christian Thoughts). At the same time, he entered upon his work in Belgrade as a theological teacher at the 4th École normale Superieure; being in charge of the classes of Veselin Čajkanović, at the Faculty of Philosophy of the University of Belgrade; and in 1943 he was appointed professor at the Belgrade's Faculty of Theology. His eloquence made him the most prominent theologian of the Serbian Orthodox Church after Nikolaj Velimirović and Justin Popović, and his attacks on the Vatican's proposed Concordat evoked a prohibition by the government.

Dimitrije Najdanović, like Veselin Čajkanović and some others, taught at the University of Belgrade throughout the time of Nazi Germany and Axis occupation of Serbia while Croatia joined Hitler avoiding "occupation". Before the Soviet troops liberated Belgrade and before the provisional government of the so-called Democratic Federal Yugoslavia put Tito in power for life, Najdanović left his teaching post at the Faculty of Theology and with his wife Jelena (née Filipović) left Serbia for Austria in late 1944. There, at the Lienz camp along with Russian refugees from Yugoslavia, they bore witness to that terrible occasion when the Occupation Forces betrayed the Cossack refugees to the Soviets, to be carried away and shot. That grim episode of forced Repatriation of Cossacks after World War II in 1945 became common knowledge only when Nikolai Tolstoy wrote "Minister and Massacres", blaming Harold Macmillan for advising General Charles Keightley of V Corps, the senior Allied commander in Austria responsible for Operation Keelhaul, which included the forced repatriation of up to 70,000 prisoners of war to the Soviet Union and Josip Broz Tito's Yugoslavia in 1945. At the end of the hostilities, from the displaced person camp in Austria Najdanović and Jelena left Linz for Rome, where he published Serbian Orthodox liturgical textbooks at the expense of the Vatican's generous printer.

Dorchester on Thames
In 1947 Najdanović and his wife went to England, being recommended by the Serbian Patriarch Gavrilo V to the confidence of Bishop of Gibraltar in Europe, the Right Reverend Harold Buxton. Once in London, Harold Buxton, and Arthur Foster of the World Council of Churches Service to Refugees were waiting at "Victoria Station to escort 40 Serbian students and clergy", among them Mr. and Mrs. Najdanović, "to Dorchester on Thames," near Oxford, where a Theological Training School had been opened in the Old College building under the name of Dorchester College to help the Serbian Orthodox Church, then in exile. Najdanović was named dean of faculty by Patriarch Gavrilo before he left London for Belgrade (where he died in 1950). Arthur Foster took up the duties of bursar at the college. As dean Najdanović also taught Dogmatics, Religion, Christian Apologetics and Ethics. He was also a Serbian Orthodox parish priest in Derby (1948-1960) before emigrating to Montreal, Quebec in 1960.

The Serbian students were affectionately called the Dorchester Boys  and most of them would eventually leave England for the United States and elsewhere where they took up important positions in the Serbian Orthodox Church in North and South America, including Very Rev. Milan Savich (1920-2010) of Chicago, Dr. Veselin Kesich (1921-2012) of the Saint Vladimir's Orthodox Theological Seminary, Metropolitan Irinej Kovačević (1914-1999) of the Diocese of New Gracanica - Midwestern America, and others.

Holy Trinity Parish in Montreal
Shortly after his arrival in Montreal  Najdanović encouraged his parishioners to purchase a building and property in the center of Montreal at 4259 de Bullion Street. The second floor of the building was adapted for a chapel and an apartment while the ground floor space was turned into a hall and a fellowship room. The commissions for the iconostasis and icons were given to master woodcarver Vladimir Barac and artist José Majzner respectively. The repair work on the "Holy Trinity" Serbian Orthodox Church was completed in 1961, but the consecration took place on September 6, 1964, officiated by Bishop Stefan Lastavica of the Eastern American Diocese. (Nikola Budimir of Windsor, Ontario was the Godfather.)

In 1967 Najdanović and Jelena moved to the United States where he was a priest in New York City and Phoenix, Arizona before retiring at the Glendora Health Care Center in Wooster, Ohio. He died on 24 March 1986. He was 89.

Work
Writing in "Books Abroad", Vol. 50, No. 2 (Spring, 1976) p. 439, Mateja Matejić wrote: "The name Dimitrije Najdanović may not be easy to remember for those who are not native speakers of Serbian, but once one has read a single work by the author, neither he nor his work can be forgotten. In Three Serbian Giants (Tri srpska velikana) Najdanović analyses the literary heritage of three outstanding Serbian writers and philosophers: Djura Jakšić, Petar II Petrović-Njegoš and Bishop Nikolaj Velimirović. It is a penetrating analysis, consisting of literary criticism and philosophical meditation. Najdanović not only shows the reader the art of these three great authors, but also reaches the very spirit and soul of their work, and does so with stylistic excellence unmatched by most authors. There is in his works a perfect harmony between the beauty of language and profundity of thought."
 
Tri srpska velikana remains the greatest monument of Najdanović's genius. In this, his chief aim was everywhere to understand what was individual in history.

Najdanović's theological position can only be explained in connection with Nikolaj Velimirović, and the manner in which while adopting he modified and carried out the principles of his master. Characteristically meditative, he rested with a secure footing on the great central truths of Christianity and recognized strongly their essential reasonableness and harmony. Alive to the claims of criticism, he no less strongly asserted the rights of Christian feeling.

Postscript
The war years in Yugoslavia had a decided effect in forming his judgement on political questions of high moment. He was an eye-witness on more than one occasion of the folly and excesses of the Third Reich as well as the Three Super Powers; and these scenes not only increased his love for the church, but strongly impressed him with that dread of anarchy, of popular movements ending in bloodshed, and of communistic, socialistic and fascistic views which characterized him in after life (no differently than Nikolaj Velimirović and Serbian Patriarch Gavrilo V). To these experiences, too, we may partly ascribe the reverence for law and order, for the rights of property, and for the democratic, monarchical form of government which he appears to have sincerely felt; and, orator as he became in a certain sense, gave his mind a deep conservative tinge.

See also
 Djoko Slijepčević
 Lazo M. Kostić
 Veselin Kesich
 Velibor Jonić
 Dimitrije Ljotić
 Ratko Parežanin
 Irinej Kovačević

References

1897 births
1986 deaths
Writers from Kragujevac
Serbian theologians
Serbian Orthodox clergy
Burials at the Saint Sava Serbian Orthodox Monastery in Libertyville, Illinois